The Chicago Tribune Silver Basketball was an award presented annually by the Chicago Tribune to the top men's and women's college basketball player of the Big Ten Conference. The Chicago Tribune awarded the Silver Basketball for men's basketball beginning in 1946. The Silver Basketball for women's basketball was first presented in 1988. The awards were voted on by the head coaches of the Big Ten basketball teams and the Chicago Tribune staff.

Past winners

Men
2007 Alando Tucker, Wisconsin
 2006 Terence Dials, Ohio State
 2005 Dee Brown, Illinois
 2004 Devin Harris, Wisconsin
 2003 Brian Cook, Illinois
 2002 Jared Jeffries, Indiana
 2001 Frank Williams, Illinois
 2000 Morris Peterson, Michigan State
 1999 Mateen Cleaves, Michigan State
 1998 Mateen Cleaves, Michigan State
 1997 Bobby Jackson, Minnesota (vacated)
 1996 Brian Evans, Indiana
 1995 Shawn Respert, Michigan State
 1994 Glenn Robinson, Purdue
 1993 Calbert Cheaney, Indiana
 1992 Jim Jackson, Ohio State
 1991 Jim Jackson, Ohio State
 1990 Steve Smith, Michigan State
 1989 Glen Rice, Michigan
 1988 Gary Grant, Michigan
 1987 Steve Alford, Indiana
 1986 Scott Skiles, Michigan State
 1985 Roy Tarpley, Michigan
 1984 Jim Rowinski, Purdue
 1983 Randy Wittman, Indiana
 1982 Clark Kellogg, Ohio State
 1981 Ray Tolbert, Indiana
 1980 Mike Woodson, Indiana
 1979 Magic Johnson, Michigan State
 1978 Mychal Thompson, Minnesota
 1977 Kent Benson, Indiana
 1976 Scott May, Indiana
 1975 Scott May, Indiana
 1974 Campy Russell, Michigan
 1973 Steve Downing, Indiana
 1972 Jim Brewer, Minnesota
 1971 Jim Cleamons, Ohio State
 1970 Rick Mount, Purdue
 1969 Rick Mount, Purdue
 1968 Samuel Williams, Iowa
 1967 Jim Dawson, Illinois
 1966 Cazzie Russell, Michigan
 1965 Cazzie Russell, Michigan
 1964 Gary Bradds, Ohio State
 1963 Gary Bradds, Ohio State
 1962 Jerry Lucas, Ohio State
 1961 Jerry Lucas, Ohio State
 1960 Jerry Lucas, Ohio State
 1959 Johnny Green, Michigan State
 1958 Archie Dees, Indiana
 1957 Archie Dees, Indiana
 1956 Robin Freeman, Ohio State
 1955 Chuck Mencel, Minnesota
 1954 Johnny Kerr, Illinois
 1953 Don Schlundt, Indiana
 1952 Chuck Darling, Iowa
 1951 Don Sunderlage, Illinois
 1950 Don Rehfeldt, Wisconsin
 1949 Dwight Eddleman, Illinois
 1948 Murray Wier, Iowa
 1947 Glen Selbo, Wisconsin
 1946 Max Morris, Northwestern

Women
 2007 Jessica Davenport, Ohio State
 2006 Jessica Davenport, Ohio State
 2005 Jessica Davenport, Ohio State
 2004 Kelly Mazzante, Penn State
 2003 Kelly Mazzante, Penn State
 2002 Lindsay Whalen, Minnesota
 2001 Katie Douglas, Purdue
 2000 Helen Darling, Penn State
 1999 Stephanie White-McCarty, Purdue
 1998 Tangela Smith, Iowa
 1997 Jannon Roland, Purdue
 1996 Katie Smith, Ohio State
 1995 Stacey Lovelace, Purdue
 1994 Carol Ann Shudlick, Minnesota
 1993 Audrey Burcy, Ohio State
 1992 MaChelle Joseph, Purdue
 1991 Joy Holmes, Purdue
 1991 Pam Owens, Indiana University
 1990 Franthea Price, Iowa
 1989 Nikita Lowry, Ohio State
 1988 Michelle Edwards, Iowa

See also
 Chicago Tribune Silver Football

External links
 Men's basketball winners
 Women's basketball winners

Sil
College basketball trophies and awards in the United States
Big Ten Conference basketball
Awards established in 1946
Awards disestablished in 2007
Awards by newspapers
1946 establishments in Illinois